This is a male family tree for all the Ottoman Sultans and their mothers.


Significant periods in Ottoman history

See also
 Ottoman dynasty
 Ottoman history
 Ottoman Empire
 Line of succession to the former Ottoman throne
List of sultans of the Ottoman empire
 List of mothers of the Ottoman sultans
 Valide sultan
 Haseki sultan

Further reading

Bernard Lewis, The Emergence of Modern Turkey (Studies in Middle Eastern History), Publisher: Oxford University Press, USA; 3rd edition (September 6, 2001); Paperback: 568 pages; ;

References

External links

 Website of the 700th Anniversary of the Ottoman Empire
 Official website of the immediate living descendants of the Ottoman Dynasty

Ottoman dynasty
Dynasty genealogy
Muslim family trees